Pope Alexander VI (r. 1492–1503) created 43 new cardinals in 9 consistories:

31 August 1492 
 Juan de Borja-Llanzol (Llançol) de Romani, papal nephew, archbishop of Monreale – cardinal-priest of S. Susanna, † 1 August 1503

20 September 1493 
All the new cardinals received the titles on 23 September 1493.

 Jean Bilhères de Lagraulas, O.S.B., bishop of Lombès, ambassador of the King of France – cardinal-priest of S. Sabina, † 6 August 1499
 Giovanni Antonio Sangiorgio, bishop of Alessandria – cardinal-priest of SS. Nereo ed Achilleo, then cardinal-bishop of Tusculum (23 December 1503), cardinal-bishop of Palestrina (17 September 1507), cardinal-bishop of Sabina (22 September 1508), † 14 March 1509
 Bernardino López de Carvajal, bishop of Cartagena – cardinal-priest of SS. Marcelino e Pietro, then cardinal-priest of S. Croce in Gerusalmme (2 February 1495), cardinal-bishop of Albano (3 August 1507), cardinal-bishop of Tusculum (17 September 1507), cardinal-bishop of Palestrina (22 September 1508), cardinal-bishop of Sabina (28 March 1509); excommunicated and deposed on 24 October 1511 for his participation in the schismatic pseudo-council of Pisa; reinstated on 27 June 1513 as cardinal-bishop of Sabina, then cardinal-bishop of Ostia e Velletri (24 July 1521), † 16 December 1523
 Cesare Borgia, Son of the Pope – cardinal-deacon of S. Maria Nuova; resigned his cardinalate on 18 August 1498, † 12 March 1507
 Giuliano Cesarini, iuniore – cardinal-deacon of SS. Sergio e Bacco, then cardinal-deacon of S. Angelo (12 June 1503), † 1 May 1510
 Domenico Grimani – cardinal-deacon of S. Nicola inter Imagines, then cardinal-priest of S. Nicola inter Imagines (28 March 1498), cardinal-priest of S. Marco (25 December 1503), cardinal-bishop of Albano (22 September 1508), cardinal-bishop of Tusculum (3 June 1509), cardinal-bishop of Porto e Santa Rufina (20 January 151), † 27 August 1523
 Alessandro Farnese  – cardinal-deacon of SS. Cosma e Damiano, then cardinal-deacon of S. Eustachio (11 October 1503), cardinal-bishop of Tusculum (15 June 1519), cardinal-bishop of Palestrina (9 December 1523), cardinal-bishop of Sabina (18 December 1523), cardinal-bishop of Porto e Santa Rufina (20 May 1524), cardinal-bishop of Ostia e Velletri (15 June 1524), became Pope Paul III on 13 October 1534, † 10 November 1549
 Bernardino Lunati – cardinal-deacon of S. Ciriaco, † 8 August 1497
 Raymond Peraudi, O.S.A., bishop of Gurk – cardinal-deacon of S. Maria in Cosmedin, then cardinal-priest of S. Vitale (1494), cardinal-priest of S. Maria Nuova (29 April 1499), † 5 September 1505
 John Morton, archbishop of Canterbury – cardinal-priest of S. Anastasia, † 15 September 1500
 Fryderyk Jagiellończyk, administrator of Kraków – cardinal-priest of S. Lucia in Septisolio, † 14 March 1503
 Ippolito d'Este, administrator of Esztergom – cardinal-deacon of S. Lucia in Silice, † 3 September 1520

May 1494 
  Luigi d'Aragona – cardinal-deacon of S. Maria in Cosmedin, † 21 January 1519

16 January 1495 

 Guillaume Briçonnet, bishop of St.-Malo – cardinal-priest of S. Pudenziana, then cardinal-bishop of Albano (17 September 1507), cardinal-bishop of Tusculum (22 September 1508), cardinal-bishop of Palestrina (3 June 1509); excommunicated and deposed on 24 October 1511 for his participation in the schismatic pseudo-council of Pisa; reinstated on 7 April 1514 as cardinal-priest of S. Pudenziana, † 14 December 1514

21 January  1495 
 Philippe de Luxembourg, bishop of Le Mans – cardinal-priest of SS. Marcellino e Pietro (received the title on 2 February 1495), then cardinal-bishop of Albano (3 June 1509), cardinal-bishop of Tusculum (20 January 1511), † 2 June 1519

19 February 1496 
All the new cardinals received the titles on 24 February 1496.
 Juan López, bishop of Perugia – cardinal-priest of S. Maria in Trastevere, † 5 August 1501
 Bartolomé Martí, bishop of Segorbe – cardinal-deacon of S. Agata in Suburra, † 25 March 1500
 Juan de Castro, bishop of Agrigento  – cardinal-priest of S. Prisca, † 29 September 1506
 Juan de Borja Lanzol de Romaní, el menor, relative of the Pope, bishop-elect of Melfi – cardinal-deacon of S. Maria in Via Lata, † 17 January 1500

17 September  1498 
 Georges d'Amboise, archbishop of Rouen – cardinal-priest of S. Sisto, † 25 May 1510

28 September  1500 

  Diego Hurtado de Mendoza y Quiñones, archbishop of Seville – cardinal-priest of S. Sabina (received the title on 5 October 1500), † 14 October 1502
  Amanieu d'Albret – cardinal-deacon of S. Nicola in Carcere (received the title on 5 October 1500), † 20 December 1520
  Pedro Luis de Borja Lanzol de Romaní, O.S.Io.Hieros., archbishop-elect of Valencia – cardinal-deacon of S. Maria in Via Lata (received the title on 5 October 1500), then cardinal-priest of S. Marcello (7 December 1503), † 4 October 1511
  Jaume Serra i Cau, archbishop of Oristano – cardinal-priest of S. Vitale (received the title on 5 October 1500), then cardinal-priest of S. Clemente (28 June 1502), cardinal-bishop of Albano (20 January 1511), † 15 March 1517
  Pietro Isvalies, archbishop of Reggio di Calabria – cardinal-priest of S. Ciriaco (received the title on 5 October 1500), then cardinal-priest of S. Pudenziana (18 August 1507), † 22 September 1511
  Francisco de Borja, archbishop of Cosenza – cardinal-priest of S. Cecilia (received the title on 5 October 1500), then cardinal-priest of SS. Nero ed Achilleo (11 August 1506), † 4 November 1511
  Juan de Vera, archbishop of Salerno – cardinal-priest of S. Balbina (received the title on 5 October 1500), † 4 May 1507
  Ludovico Prodocator, bishop of Capacio – cardinal-priest of S. Agata in Suburra (received the title on 5 October 1500), † 25 August 1504
  Antonio Trivulzio, O.C.R.S.A., bishop of Como – cardinal-priest of S. Anastasia (received the title probably in November 1500), then cardinal-priest of S. Stefano in Monte Celio (1 July 1504), † 18 March 1508
  Giovanni Baptista Ferrari, bishop of Modena – cardinal-priest of S. Crisogono (received the title on 5 October 1500), † 20 July 1502
  Tamás Bakócz, archbishop of Esztergom, chancellor of the Kingdom of Hungary – cardinal-priest of SS. Silvestro e Martino (received the title probably in November 1500), † 11 June 1521
  Marco Cornaro – cardinal-deacon of S. Maria in Portico (received the title on 5 October 1500), then cardinal-deacon of S. Maria in Via Lata (19 March 1513), cardinal-priest of S. Marco (14 December 1523), cardinal-bishop of Albano (20 May 124), cardinal-bishop of Palestrina (15 June 1524), † 24 July 1524
  Gianstefano Ferrero, bishop of Vercelli (in pectore, published on 28 June 1502) – cardinal-priest of S. Vitale (received the title on 28 June 1502), then cardinal-priest of SS. Sergio e Bacco (22 December 1505), † 5 October 1510

31 May 1503 

  Juan Castellar y de Borja, archbishop of Trani – cardinal-priest of S. Maria in Trastevere (received the title on 12 June 1503), † 1 January 1505
  Francisco de Remolins, archbishop of Sorrento – cardinal-priest of SS. Giovanni e Paolo (received the title on 12 June 1503), then cardinal-priest of S. Marcello (27 October 1511), cardinal-bishop of Albano (16 March 1517), † 5 February 1518
  Francesco Soderini, bishop of Volterra – cardinal-priest of S. Susanna (received the title probably on 11 October 1503), then cardinal-priest of SS. XII Apostoli (15 September 1508), cardinal-bishop of Sabina (29 October 1511), cardinal-bishop of Tivoli (27 June 1513), cardinal-bishop of Palestrina (18 July 1516), cardinal-bishop of Porto e Santa Rufina (9 December 1523), cardinal-bishop of Ostia e Velletri (18 December 1523), † 17 May 1524
  Melchior von Meckau, bishop of Brixen – cardinal-priest of S. Nicola inter Imagines (received the title on 25 December 1503), then cardinal-priest of S. Stefano in Monte Celio (4 January 1509?), † 3 March 1509
  Niccolò Fieschi, bishop-elect of Fréjus – cardinal-priest of S. Lucia in Septisolio (received the title on 12 June 1503), then cardinal-priest of S. Prisca (5 October 1506), cardinal-bishop of Albano (5 February 1518), cardinal-bishop of Sabina (24 July 1521), cardinal-bishop of Porto e Santa Rufina (18 December 1523), cardinal-bishop of Ostia e Velletri (20 May 1524), † 15 June 1524
  Francisco Desprats, bishop of Leon – cardinal-priest of SS. Sergio e Bacco (received the title on 12 June 1503), † 10 September 1504
  Adriano Castellesi, bishop of Hereford – cardinal-priest of S. Crisogono (received the title on 12 June 1503); excommunicated and deposed on 5 July 1518, † December  1521
  Jaime de Casanova – cardinal-priest of S. Stefano in Monte Celio (received the title on 12 June 1503), † 4 June 1504
  Francisco Lloris y de Borja, bishop of Elne – cardinal-deacon of S. Sabina (received the title on 12 June 1503), then cardinal-deacon of S. Maria Nuova (17 December 1505), † 22 July 1506

Notes

Sources 

 Konrad Eubel, Hierarchia Catholica, vol. II, Münster 1914 and vol. III, Münster 1922

Alexander VI
Pope Alexander VI
College of Cardinals